Richard Tillman Fountain (February 15, 1885 – February 21, 1945) was a North Carolina politician who served as Speaker of the North Carolina House of Representatives in 1927 and as the 16th Lieutenant Governor of North Carolina from 1929 to 1933 under Governor Oliver M. Gardner.

Fountain was born in Edgecombe County, North Carolina, on February 15, 1885, was educated in the public schools of Edgecombe County and the Tarboro Male Academy, and attended the University of North Carolina at Chapel Hill from 1905 to 1907. Fountain was admitted to the N.C. Bar and began practicing law in Rocky Mount in 1907. He was appointed judge of the municipal court of the city of Rocky Mount in 1911 and held the office until 1918. He was also a trustee of the Rocky Mount Graded Schools (1917–1935), secretary to the board of trustees (1917–1921), and the chairman of the board (1924–1931).

In 1918 Fountain was elected to the North Carolina House of Representatives, where he served five unopposed terms and was elected speaker in 1927. After serving one term as lieutenant governor (the maximum then allowed), Fountain ran for governor in 1932, but lost in a Democratic primary runoff to John C.B. Ehringhaus. From 1934 until 1942 Fountain edited a newspaper, the Rocky Mount Herald. In 1936 and 1942 he ran unsuccessfully in the primary for the U.S. Senate against the incumbent senator, Josiah W. Bailey. On February 21, 1945, Fountain died in Rocky Mount at the age of sixty.

References
OurCampaigns.com
Richard Tillman Fountain Papers at East Carolina University

1885 births
1945 deaths
Lieutenant Governors of North Carolina
North Carolina lawyers
Speakers of the North Carolina House of Representatives
Democratic Party members of the North Carolina House of Representatives
People from Edgecombe County, North Carolina
People from Rocky Mount, North Carolina
University of North Carolina at Chapel Hill alumni
20th-century American politicians
20th-century American lawyers